Butsfield is a village in County Durham, England. It is situated a few miles to the south of Consett, near the village of Satley. Butsfield Burn Farm is the farm located at the centre of the Butsfield area.

Butsfield was the site of the murder of council officer Harry Collinson by Albert Dryden in June 1991.

References

Villages in County Durham